The 1950 Cal Poly Mustangs football team represented California Polytechnic State College—now known as California Polytechnic State University, San Luis Obispo—as a member of the California Collegiate Athletic Association (CCAA) during the 1950 college football season. Led by first-year head coach LeRoy Hughes, Cal Poly compiled an overall record of 3–7 with a mark of 0–4 in conference play, placing last out of five teams in the CCAA. The Mustangs played home games at Mustang Stadium in San Luis Obispo, California.

Schedule

References

Cal Poly
Cal Poly Mustangs football seasons
Cal Poly Mustangs football